Brazil competed at the 1980 Summer Olympics in Moscow, USSR. 106 competitors, 91 men and 15 women, took part in 72 events in 14 sports. Brazilian athletes conquered gold medals again after 24 years, since the 1956 Summer Olympics. Brazil won two gold and two bronze medals in 1980.

Both the two gold medals were obtained in sailing and they were the first gold medals in the history of the sport. Lars Sigurd Bjorkström and Alexandre Welter were Olympic champions in Tornado class. Marcos Soares and Eduardo Penido won the gold medal in the 470 class.

Brazil won a medal in a relay event in swimming for the first time - the bronze in men's 4 × 200 metre freestyle relay.

The current world record holder and bronze medalist triple jumper João Carlos de Oliveira repeated the result in men's triple jump in a very controversial event. The Soviet Union's Jaak Uudmäe and Viktor Saneyev placed first and second, ahead of Oliveira. Both him and fourth place Australia's Ian Campbell produced long jumps, but they were declared fouls by the officials and not measured.

Medalists

Archery

In its first Olympic archery competition, Brazil sent one woman and one man.
Men

Women

Athletics

Men
Track & road events

Field events

Women
Combined events – Pentathlon

Basketball

Men

Preliminary round
The top two teams from each group advance to the final round group, while the remaining teams compete for 8th through 12th places in the classification group. Hosts Soviet Union and the world champions Yugoslavia advanced undefeated to the final round. Meanwhile, qualification in Group C was closely contested between Italy, Cuba and Australia, which ended up being decided by a third tiebreaker in favor of the first two teams.

Group A

Final round
The first two places in the preliminary group compete for the gold medal, while the third and fourth places compete for the bronze. The remaining teams' group ranking determines their positions in the final standings. The host nation failed to compete for the gold in spite of finishing the preliminary round undefeated, due to losses against the other two group leaders Yugoslavia and  especially Italy, since the result from that match served as tiebreaker, giving the latter a passport to the gold medal match. The Soviet Union then won the bronze against Spain. Yugoslavia earned their first and only gold medal in men's basketball at this Olympic Games.
Results from Yugoslavia vs. Spain, Italy vs. Cuba and Soviet Union vs. Brazil were carried over from the preliminary round.

Team Roster:
 André Ernesto Stoffel 
 Luiz Gustavo de Lage 
 José Carlos Santos Saiani 
 Milton Setrini
 Wagner Machado da Silva 
 Marcos Abdalla Leite
 Gilson Trindade de Jesus 
 Marcel Ramon de Souza 
 Adilson de Nascimento 
 Marcelo Vido 
 Oscar Schmidt 
 Ricardo Cardoso Guimarães

Boxing

Men

Cycling

Six cyclists represented Brazil in 1980.

Road

Track
1000m time trial

Pursuit

Diving

Men

Gymnastics

Artistic
Men

Women

Judo

Men

Rowing

Men

Sailing

Open

Shooting

Open

Swimming

Men

Volleyball

Men

Pool B

|}

|}

5th–8th semifinals

|}

5th place match

|}

Team Roster
 João Alves Granjeiro
 Mario Xandó Oliveira Neto
 Antonio Gueiros Badalhoca 
 José Montanaro
 Antonio Carlos Moreno 
 Renan Dal Zotto
 William Carvalho Silva
 Amauri Ribeiro
 Bernardo Rezende
 Jean Luc Rosat
 Deraldo Wanderley
 Bernard Rajzman

Women

Group B

|}

|}

5th–8th place semifinals

|}

7th place match

|}
Team Roster
 Denise Porto Mattioli
 Ivonette Das Neves
 Lenice Peluso Oliveira
 Regina Vilela Santos
 Fernanda Emerick Silva
 Paula Hernandez Rodrigues Mello
 Isabel Salgado
 Eliana Maria Aleixo
 Maria Castanheira
 Jaqueline Silva
 Vera Mossa
 Rita de Cássia Teixeira

Weightlifting

Men

References

Nations at the 1980 Summer Olympics
1980 Summer Olympics
Olympics